Crassispira sinensis is a species of sea snail, a marine gastropod mollusk in the family Pseudomelatomidae.

Description
The shell contains numerous whorls, convex, slightly angulated and noduled on the periphery. They are flexuously longitudinally ribbed below and cancellated by raised revolving lines. The suture is bordered by an obliquely nodulous band. The color of the shell is  yellowish or flesh-brown, sometimes narrowly dark-banded at the suture and base. The interior is yellowish.

Distribution
This marine species occurs in the China Sea and off New Guinea.

References

 Winckworth, R. (1940). A systematic list of the Investigator Mollusca. Proceedings of the Malacological Society of London. 24: 19–29.

External links
  Tucker, J.K. 2004 Catalog of recent and fossil turrids (Mollusca: Gastropoda). Zootaxa 682:1–1295

sinensis
Gastropods described in 1843